The Orbigny-Bernon Museum (French: Musée d'Orbigny-Bernon) is a history museum in the French city of La Rochelle.

It was founded in 1917, and contains collections relating to the history of La Rochelle, as well as an important collection of porcelains of the city. A floor is also dedicated to Far Eastern art, with the collection of the French diplomat Baron Charles de Chassiron.

It is now permanently closed.

Collections

Notes

External links
 Local tourist information about the museum
 Musée d'Orbigny-Bernon, New York Times

Museums in La Rochelle
Archaeological museums in France
1917 establishments in France
Museums established in 1917
Ceramics museums in France